WQCT (1520 AM) is a radio station broadcasting a classic hits format. Licensed to Bryan, Ohio, United States, the station is currently owned by Impact Radio, LLC and features programming from ABC Radio and Dial Global.

Previous logo

References

External links

QCT